Sarah Jane Katsoulis (born 10 May 1984 in Milton) is an Australian swimmer.

She won a bronze medal in the 200 m breaststroke at the 2010 Commonwealth Games.

References

1984 births
Living people
Australian female breaststroke swimmers
Sportswomen from New South Wales
Swimmers at the 2010 Commonwealth Games
Commonwealth Games bronze medallists for Australia
People from the South Coast (New South Wales)
World Aquatics Championships medalists in swimming
Medalists at the FINA World Swimming Championships (25 m)
Commonwealth Games medallists in swimming
Universiade medalists in swimming
Universiade silver medalists for Australia
Medalists at the 2007 Summer Universiade
20th-century Australian women
21st-century Australian women
Medallists at the 2010 Commonwealth Games